The Battle of Pelusium (373 BC) Or The battle of Mendes took place after the Persian king Artaxerxes II launched an attack on Egypt with the aim of restoring Egypt to Persian rule. The campaign failed, and ended with the defeat of the Persians and their Greek mercenaries

Background 
In 525 BC, a Persian force led by Cambyses II invaded Egypt. This force was able to enter Memphis, but could not control all of Egypt when Cambyses II sent his forces to occupy Siwa Oasis. This force became known as the Lost Army of Cambyses. Cambyses was also unable to occupy much of Upper Egypt and Nubia. Egypt was full of turmoil and fighting, until an uprising succeeded in 404 BC, led by an Egyptian prince called Amyrtaeus. Amyrtaeus was able to gain independence for Egypt, but Egypt suffered a local rule full of internal problems between the royal princes. Nectanebo I became the first king of the 30th dynasty, after he was able to wrest the rule from the last king of the 29th dynasty (Nepherites II). The Persians viewed Egypt as just a rebellious province of Persia, so they tried to reconquer it several times during the reign of the 29th Dynasty. They tried to invade Egypt and failed twice, in 385 and 383 BC. The Persian King Artaxerxes was aware of the turmoil in Egypt between the royal family, so he planned to invade and restore Egypt. As part of that plan, Artaxerxes concluded a peace treaty with the Athenians. Under this treaty, Egypt became without allies, and the Athenian general Shabrias was summoned in 379 BC.

Preparing the Persians for the campaign 
The Achaemenid concluded a peace treaty with the Athenians in order to leave Egypt without allies and The Persians gathered a large fleet of 500 ships that were collected in Phoenicia and Acre, almost all full of Greek mercenaries and The Persians collected a Huge ground forces consisting of 220,000 soldiers that passed through Gaza

The battle 
The Persians’ march began during a five-day journey from Gaza to Pelusium (Port Said). The Persians attacked Pelusium, however the Egyptians succeeded in defending it, so the Persians decided to use the Nile branch and rally around them. The Persians and their Greek mercenaries wanted to march towards Memphis and leave Pelusium after they succeeded in entering the country through the Nile branch, but they differed among themselves. This hesitation caused a counterattack by Nectanebo I, taking advantage of the Nile floods, which caused swamps. This hindered the movement of the Persians and their Greeks mercenaries and they were defeated and withdrew in July 373 BC.

References 

373 BC
Pelusium
Pelusium
Pelusium
Thirtieth Dynasty of Egypt